Euphrasia, or eyebright, is a genus of about 450 species of herbaceous flowering plants in the family Orobanchaceae (formerly included in the Scrophulariaceae), with a cosmopolitan distribution. They are hemiparasitic on grasses and other plants. The common name refers to the plant's use in treating eye infections.

Many species are found in alpine or sub-alpine meadows where snow is common. Flowers usually are borne terminally, are zygomorphic, and have a lower petal shaped like a lip. The most common flower colours are purple, blue-white, and violet. Some species have yellow markings on the lower petal to act as a guide to pollinating insects.

Alternative names, mainly in herbalism, are Augentrostkraut, Euphrasiae herba, Herba Euphrasiae and Herbe d'Euphraise.

Use in herbalism and medicine
The plant was known to classical herbalists, but then was not referred to until mentioned again in 1305. Nicholas Culpeper assigned it to the Zodiac sign Leo, claiming that it strengthened the brain. It was also used to treat bad memory and vertigo.

In the Elizabethan era, the plant was used in ales, and Gervase Markham's Countrie Farm (1616) said that one should "Drinke everie morning a small draught of Eyebright wine."

Herbalists use eyebright as a poultice with or without concurrent administration of a tea for the redness, swelling, and visual disturbances caused by blepharitis, and conjunctivitis. The herb is also used for eyestrain and to relieve inflammation caused by colds, coughs, sinus infections, sore throats, and hay fever.

Parts used include the leaf, the stem, and small pieces of the flowers. Typical preparations include a warm compress, or tea. Eyebright preparations are also available as an extract or capsule.

A 2010 report from the European Medicines Agency on the efficacy of Euphrasia remedies states:

From the presence of secondary metabolites, an astringent and anti-inflammatory activity can be hypothesized for Euphrasia preparations. The ocular use of Euphrasia is based upon tradition. However, since the efficacy of the claimed ocular uses is undocumented and external eye application is not hygienic, therapeutic use cannot be recommended.

Phylogeny
The phylogeny of the genera of Rhinantheae has been explored using molecular characters. Euphrasia belongs to the core Rhinantheae. Euphrasia is the sister genus to Odontites, Bellardia, Tozzia, and Hedbergia. In turn, these five genera share phylogenetic affinities with Bartsia.

Taxonomy and identification
The genus Euphrasia is taxonomically complicated due to many species being interfertile and prone to hybridisation. Despite there having been a number of taxonomic revisions the appropriate rank of many taxa, as well as the relationships between them, remains unclear.

Selected species

 Euphrasia × aequalis
 Euphrasia alpina
 Euphrasia alsa F.Muell.
 Euphrasia anglica Pugsley
 Euphrasia arctica Lange ex Rostrup
Euphrasia arctica subsp. arctica (E.borealis auct. non (F.Towns.) Wettsd.)
Euphrasia arctica sybsp. borealis (F.Towns) Yeo
 Euphrasia arguta – believed extinct, rediscovered 2008
 Euphrasia azorica
 Euphrasia brevipila
 Euphrasia calida
 Euphrasia cambrica Pugsley
 Euphrasia campbelliae Pugsley
 Euphrasia collina R.Br. – purple eyebright
 Euphrasia collina ssp. muelleri – Mueller's eyebright
 Euphrasia collina ssp. osbornii – Osborn's eyebright
 Euphrasia confusa Pugsley
 Euphrasia coreana W.Becker – Korean eyebright
 Euphrasia cuneata – North Island eyebright
 Euphrasia crassiuscula Gand
 Euphrasia fabula
 Euphrasia fennica
 Euphrasia foulaensis F.Towns. ex Wettst
 Euphrasia fragosa – shy eyebright, Southport eyebright
 Euphrasia frigida Pugsley – cold-weather eyebright
 Euphrasia gibbsiae
 Euphrasia gibbsiae subsp. psilantherea
 Euphrasia glabrescens
 Euprasia grandiflora
 Euphrasia heslop-harrisonii Pugsley
 Euphrasia hirtella
 Euphrasia hudsoniana – Hudson's eyebright
 Euphrasia insignis Wettst
 Euphrasia kingii
 Euphrasia lasianthera – hairy eyebright
 Euphrasia marshallii Pugsley
 Euphrasia micrantha Rchb.
 Euphrasia minima
 Euphrasia nemorosa  (Pers.) Wallr. – common eyebright
 Euphrasia officinalis coll. – doctor's eyebright, or medical eyebright
 Euphrasia officinalis L – see Euphrasia rostkoviana
 Euphrasia oakesii – Oakes' eyebright
 Euphrasia ostenfeldii (Pugsley) Yeo
 Euphrasia parviflora
 Euphrasia pseudokerneri Pugsley – chalk eyebright
 Euphrasia randii – small eyebright
 Euphrasia rivularis Pugsley
 Euphrasia rostkoviana Hayne – red eyebright, "figwort"
Euphrasia rostkoviana subsp. rostkoviana
Euphrasia rostkoviana subsp. montana (Jord.) Wettst.
 Euphrasia rotundifolia Pugsley
 Euphrasia ruptura – extinct
 Euphrasia salisburgensis Funk.
 Euphrasia scabra R.Br. – rough eyebright
 Euphrasia scottica Wettst.
 Euphrasia semipicta – peninsula eyebright
 Euphrasia striata R.Br.
 Euphrasia stricta D.Wolff ex J.F.Lehm.
 Euphrasia subarctica – arctic eyebright
 Euphrasia suborbicularis – roundleaf eyebright
 Euphrasia tatrae
 Euphrasia tetraquetra (Bréb.) .
 Euphrasia vernalis
 Euphrasia × vestita
 Euphrasia vigursii Davey
 Euphrasia × villosa
 Euphrasia vinacea – glacier eyebright
 Euphrasia zelandica
 Euphrasia sp. 'Bivouac Bay' – Bivouac Bay eyebright

Footnotes

References

 
Orobanchaceae genera
Taxa named by Carl Linnaeus
Parasitic plants